Tudorel Bratu (born 23 April 1991) is a Romanian rugby union player. He plays in the scrum-half. He played for SuperLiga club CSM București. He was called for the 2015 Rugby World Cup, playing in his first game for Romania, without scoring.

References

External links

1991 births
Living people
RCJ Farul Constanța players
CS Dinamo București (rugby union) players
CSM București (rugby union) players
Romanian rugby union players
Romania international rugby union players
Rugby union scrum-halves